Roques also referred to as Roques-du-Gers is a commune in the Gers department in southwestern France.

Geography

Population

Personalities
It was home to American architectural scholar, Norval White.

See also
Communes of the Gers department

References

Communes of Gers